Catia Faria (born 1980) is a Portuguese moral philosopher and activist for animal rights and feminism. She is assistant professor in Applied Ethics at the Complutense University of Madrid, and is a board member of the UPF-Centre for Animal Ethics. Faria specialises in normative and applied ethics, especially focusing on how they apply to the moral consideration of non-human animals. In 2022, she is published her first book Animal Ethics in the Wild: Wild Animal Suffering and Intervention in Nature.

Education and career 
Faria received a Bachelor of Arts in Philosophy from the University of Porto, a Master's in Cognitive Sciences from the University of Barcelona and a PhD in Moral Philosophy from Pompeu Fabra University. Faria's thesis was the first of its kind to defend the idea that humans should help non-human animals in the wild to reduce the problem of wild animal suffering; it was assessed by Genoveva Martí, Alasdair Cochrane and Jeff McMahan, and supervised by Paula Casal, Oscar Horta and Joao Cardoso Rosas.

Faria is assistant professor in Applied Ethics at the Complutense University of Madrid and formerly worked as a postdoctoral researcher for the Portuguese Foundation for Science and Technology at the University of Minho, as lecturer in Ethics and Sustainability at Pompeu Fabra University and was a visiting researcher at the Oxford Uehiro Centre for Practical Ethics. 

In 2015, Faria co-edited, with Eze Paez, a double volume of the journal Relations. Beyond Anthropocentrism, on the problem of wild animal suffering and ways to reduce it. She has also authored articles for the University of Oxford's Practical Ethics blog; Nietzsche's Horse, the Spanish online newspaper ElDiario.es's blog on animal issues; and Pikara Magazine, the online feminist magazine. In 2020, Faria co-authored, with Oscar Horta, a chapter on welfare biology in The Routledge Handbook of Animal Ethics. Her first book, Animal Ethics in the Wild: Wild Animal Suffering and Intervention in Nature, was published in 2022.

Philosophy 
Faria is critical of the environmentalist view that nature should be left alone and argues that environmentalists intervene in nature constantly for anthropocentric benefit and to further their own aims; she asserts that animal and environmental ethics are incompatible because of their differing moral consideration of non-human animals. Faria claims that those who reject speciesism should give moral consideration to the well-being and interests of non-human animals in the wild, as sentient beings, and work towards reducing their suffering due to natural causes.

Faria argues that both intersectional feminism and antispeciesism are necessary in the fight for equality and justice. She is the originator of "xenozoopolis", a hybrid of xenofeminism and antispeciesism, which calls for the abolition of the "human-alien binary". Faria also asserts that a feminist approach towards antispeciesism implies veganism.

Faria distances herself from ecofeminism, which she criticises for its view that the main source of harm for non-human animals in the wild is patriarchal culture and that the best way to help them is through conservation, as this is built on the premise that nature and natural processes are idyllic for non-human animals. Faria argues that this view of nature is inaccurate and that suffering is commonly experienced by these individuals. She asserts that while we should replace the existing male paradigms of intervention in nature, such as hunting, this does not mean that the solution is non-intervention. She instead contends that we should work towards helping these individuals.

Selected publications

References

Further reading

External links 
 
 Catia Faria publications on elDiario.es
 Catia Faria publications on Medium
 Obligations of Assistance and Wild Animals with Catia Faria on Knowing Animals (episode 97)
 Post-Darwinian Nature and Ethics (in Spanish)

1980 births
Living people
21st-century Portuguese philosophers
Animal ethicists
Animal rights scholars
Academic staff of the Complutense University of Madrid
Feminist ethicists
Feminist philosophers
People from Porto
Pompeu Fabra University alumni
Portuguese animal rights activists
Portuguese ethicists
Portuguese feminists
Portuguese women activists
University of Barcelona alumni
University of Porto alumni
Veganism activists